The America Zone was one of the three regional zones of the 1965 Davis Cup.

5 teams entered the America Zone, with the winner going on to compete in the Inter-Zonal Zone against the winners of the Eastern Zone and Europe Zone. The United States defeated Mexico in the final and progressed to the Inter-Zonal Zone.

Draw

Quarterfinals

Caribbean/West Indies vs. New Zealand

Semifinals

Mexico vs. New Zealand

United States vs. Canada

Final

United States vs. Mexico

References

External links
Davis Cup official website

Davis Cup Americas Zone
America Zone
Davis Cup